was a Japanese mathematician who worked on algebraic groups over local fields who introduced Iwahori–Hecke algebras and Iwahori subgroups.

Publications

See also
Chevalley–Iwahori–Nagata theorem

References

External links

2011 deaths
20th-century Japanese mathematicians
21st-century Japanese mathematicians
Year of birth missing